Svenska Cupen 1994-95 was the fortieth season of the main Swedish football Cup. The competition was concluded on 25 May 1995 with the Final held in Gamla Ullevi, Göteborg. Halmstads BK won 3-1 against AIK before an attendance of 4,889 spectators.

Preliminary round 1
For results see SFS-Bolletinen - Matcher i Svenska Cupen.

Preliminary round 2

For other results see SFS-Bolletinen - Matcher i Svenska Cupen.

First round

For other results see SFS-Bolletinen - Matcher i Svenska Cupen.

Second round

For other results see SFS-Bolletinen - Matcher i Svenska Cupen.

Third round

For other results see SFS-Bolletinen - Matcher i Svenska Cupen.

Fourth round

For other results see SFS-Bolletinen - Matcher i Svenska Cupen.

Fifth round
The 8 matches in this round were played between 21 September 1994 and 2 April 1995.

Quarter-finals
The 4 matches in this round were played between 6 April and 13 April 1995.

Semi-finals
The semi-finals in this round were played on 4 May 1995.

Final
The final was played on 25 May 1995 in Göteborg.

Footnotes

References 

Svenska Cupen seasons
Cupen
Cupen
Sweden